Beautiful Lies is the third studio album by British musician Birdy, released on 25 March 2016 by Atlantic Records. The album includes the singles "Keeping Your Head Up", "Wild Horses", "Words", and "Hear You Calling".

Critical reception

Beautiful Lies received generally positive reviews from critics. At Metacritic, the album received a score of 73 on Metacritic based on four reviews. AllMusic senior editor Neil Z. Yeung commended Birdy's "evolution from acoustic covers singer to confident and powerful artist" and stated, that the album "brings a depth that pulls Birdy from Ingrid Michaelson territory and into a scene occupied by Lorde, Florence, and Lana [Del Rey]." He felt that "with more life, richer texture, and an inspiring attitude, Beautiful Lies is Birdy's declaration that she is more than able to make her mark in the big leagues and join the ranks of the alternative pop pantheon". Marc Snetiker of Entertainment Weekly gave the album a B+ rating and noted that "Beautiful Lies places her square in the middle of the indie pop realm [...] Her third album is her own testament to talent and her proof that she's only dipping her toe into the tropes of her genre to spring upward from them and float onto a cloud all her own."

Dave Simpson of The Guardian called the album "certainly an adult-oriented, mainstream affair [that] has an intriguing, almost eastern feel". The Irish Times writer Tony Clayton-Lea felt the songs on Beautiful Lies showcased Birdy's songwriting abilities, with "telltale names indicating a smart artist getting to grips with the differences between inexperience and hard knocks." He added that "notwithstanding leaf or two taken from the Lorde handbook, Birdy delivers a special brand of off-centre pop music that directly reference her transition from teenager to adult."

Track listing

Notes
  signifies a co-producer
  signifies an additional producer

Personnel
Musicians

 Birdy – lead vocals (all tracks), piano (1–4, 6–14), string arrangement (4, 6, 7, 12), organ (5), acoustic guitar (8), additional keyboards (11)
 Jim Abbiss – additional programming, keyboards, percussion (1, 2)
 Seye Adelekan – bass guitar, electric guitar (1, 2)
 Rosie Danvers – conductor, string arrangement (1, 2)
 Andy Burrows – drums (1, 2)
 Úna Palliser – erhu (1)
 Asher Levitas – programming (1, 2)
 Liam Howe – synthesizer (1, 2)
 Jamie Hartman – acoustic guitar (2)
 Steve Pearce – bass guitar (3, 10)
 Chris Laws – drums (3, 10)
 Steve Mac – Hammond organ, strings, synthesizer (3); keyboards (10)
 Roy Kerr – programming (4, 6–8, 12, 13), additional keyboards (4, 7, 8, 11–13), keyboards (6), string arrangement (7)
 Tim Bran – programming (4, 6–8, 12, 13), additional keyboards (4, 6–8, 11–13), string arrangement (4, 6, 7, 12, 13), bass guitar (6, 13), Wurlitzer (7)
 Audrey Riley – string arrangement, cello (4, 6, 7, 12, 13); strings (6)
 Sophie Harris – cello (4, 6, 7, 12)
 Alex Thomas – drums (4, 6–8, 12, 13)
 Chris Tombling – lead violin (4, 6, 7, 12, 13)
 Helen Patterson – violin (4, 6, 7, 12, 13)
 Ian Humphries – violin (4, 6, 7, 12, 13)
 Joan Atherton – violin (4, 6, 7, 12, 13)
 Jon Hill – violin (4, 6, 7, 12, 13)
 Laura Melhuish – violin (4, 6, 7, 12, 13)
 Mitch McGugan – violin (4, 6, 7, 12, 13)
 Richard George – violin (4, 6, 7, 12, 13)
 Peter Lale – viola (4, 7, 12, 13)
 Sue Dench – viola (4, 7, 12, 13)
 Mpho McKenzie – backing vocals (5)
 Peter Kelleher – bass guitar (5)
 Tom Barnes – drums (5)
 Phil Cook – guitar (5)
 Ben Kohn – synthesizer (5)
 Sam Romans – backing vocals (6, 8)
 Leo Abrahams – guitar (6–8, 12), acoustic guitar (13)
 Lydia Kavina – theremin (7, 12)
 Philippe Clegg – bass guitar (9)
 Louis Van Der Westhuizen – double bass (9)
 Felix Joseph – drums, piano (9)
 George Cook – drums (9)
 Todd Oliver – guitar (9)
 Dann Pursey – percussion (10)
 Andrew Murray – string arrangement (14)
 Ian Burdge – cello (14)
 Richard Pryce – double bass (14)
 Max Baillie – viola (14)
 Emma Smith – violin (14)
 Tom Piggot-Smith – violin (14)

Technical

 Stuart Hawkes – mastering
 Craig Silvey – mixing (1, 2, 4, 7, 12)
 Serban Ghenea – mixing (3, 5, 10, 14)
 John Hanes – mixing (3, 5, 10)
 Roy Kerr – mixing (6, 9, 11, 13)
 Tim Bran – mixing (6, 9, 11, 13)
 Wez Clarke – mixing (8)
 Sam Romans – mixing (14)
 Robbie Nelson – engineering (1, 2, 4, 6–8, 11–13)
 Chris Laws – engineering (3)
 Dann Pursey – engineering (3)
 Jack Ruston – engineering (4, 7, 13)
 Ben Kohn – engineering (5)
 Graham Archer – engineering (5)
 Peter Kelleher – engineering (5)
 Tom Barnes – engineering (5)
 Cameron Gower Poole – engineering (9, 11)
 Chris Bolster – engineering (15)
 Richard Evans – engineering (15)
 Mark Gustafson – mixing assistance (1, 2, 4, 7)
 Sam Klempner – additional engineering (5)
 Felix Joseph – additional engineering (9)
 Isabel Seeliger Morley – engineering assistance (1, 2)
 Manon Grandjean – engineering assistance (1, 14)
 Tom Campbell – engineering assistance (5)
 Rob Brinkmann – engineering assistance (6–8, 12)
 Che Jackson – engineering assistance (11)

Visuals
 Frank Fieber – artwork, design
 Olivia Bee – photography

Charts

Weekly charts

Year-end charts

Certifications

References

External links
 

2016 albums
Albums produced by Steve Mac
Atlantic Records albums
Birdy (singer) albums
Albums produced by TMS (production team)
Albums produced by Jim Abbiss